, also known as High School Big Panic and Panic in High School, is a 1978 Japanese youth suspense action film directed by Gakuryū Ishii and . The film is a remake of a film of the same name released the year before and also directed by Ishii. It was released in Japan on August 19, 1978.

Plot 
A student goes on a shooting rampage and takes hostages in his own school.

Cast 
Atsuko Asano

Minoru Uchida
Shigeru Yamamoto

Reception
On Midnight Eye, Nicholas Rucka calls it "a funky late 70s film with a knock-out soundtrack, AWOL snap zooms, and more shrieks than should rightly be in anything but a horror movie."

References

External links

Panic High School at Movie Walker 
Panic High School at KINENOTE 

1978 action films
1978 films
Films directed by Sōgo Ishii
Japanese action films
Remakes of Japanese films
Nikkatsu films
1970s Japanese films
1970s Japanese-language films